XHSL-FM is a radio station in Piedras Negras, Coahuila. Broadcasting on 99.1 FM, XHSL is owned by Súper Medios de Coahuila and carries the national La Mejor format from MVS Radio.

History
The concession for XHSL was issued on August 10, 1983, to Pedro A. Martínez Herrera. In 1993, the station was sold to María de los Ángeles Guerrero Villarreal, and then in the 2000s to Súper Medios.

In 2017, Súper Medios de Coahuila sold XHSL to Master Radiodifusión, S.A. de C.V. and sister XHRE to XHMED, S.A. de C.V. and, with the two stations remaining under common operation.

References

Radio stations in Coahuila